Irresistible is a 2006 Australian mystery drama film written and directed by Ann Turner and starring Susan Sarandon, Sam Neill, and Emily Blunt.  Sophie is an American book illustrator and her family is disrupted by her husband's new co-worker, Mara.  Sophie is made to look crazy by the activities of Mara.

Plot
The film begins with Sophie, a popular American illustrator for books, walking her daughters, Ruby and Elly, home from school. She suddenly remembers she forgot to turn off the iron, and rushes to get home. When she gets there, she finds that it was still hot, but someone had already switched it off. Eventually dismissing it as a lapse of memory, she continues her daily routine of taking care of her two daughters and working on her next painting. While she's working, her husband, Craig, sends a singing telegram with flowers as an anniversary gift.

Later, while fixing dinner, Sophie senses that someone is in the house, but shrugs it off. Then Elly complains of the same feeling, and being frightened of it. Sophie has a look around and seems to notice things just slightly out of place, but again decides it's nothing of concern. Later, she has to pick up Craig because he has lost his keys. Sophie continues to feel on edge that night during their anniversary dinner. The next day, she finds one of her paintings destroyed and assumes her cat knocked over the inkwell.

She soon meets Mara, her husband's new co-worker, at a party. Mara and Sophie leave the party for a walk to the beach, where they have a talk. Mara offers Sophie her sympathy for her mother's passing, telling her she can relate because she lost her best friend, Kate, who had been an aid worker with orphans in Kosovo. She told Sophie that someone threw a Molotov cocktail through the window of the orphanage, and Kate burned to death trying to save the babies.

Over the next few weeks, items begin to go missing from Sophie's house, including one of her dresses and her daughter's favorite stuffed animal, causing the child great distress. She comes to suspect that Mara is stealing her belongings after seeing her wearing the missing dress, but Sophie has no evidence. She then breaks into Mara's house to collect proof, but gets caught and is given a restraining order. Craig does not back up Sophie in court.

Sophie soon suspects Craig may be having an affair with Mara, but he is quick to shrug it off. Sophie decides to take Craig's suggestion to stay in a friend's cabin, to spend time apart from the family and clear her mind. During a conversation with her father, it is revealed that Sophie became pregnant at the age of 18, and the baby had been surrendered to an orphanage against Sophie's wishes.

When Sophie returns home from the cabin, she realizes her cat is nowhere to be found. She suspects Mara is behind it, so she decides to sneak onto Mara's property to check. She finds her cat inside the house, but the burglar alarm goes off, attracting a neighbor's attention. Sophie hides in the basement just as Mara returns, who then searches the house to find out why the alarm was tripped. Wielding a hammer, she checks the basement while Sophie hides behind a shelf unit. Mara seems to sense someone is there but doesn't say anything. She just goes back upstairs and bolts the basement door, locking Sophie inside. Mara then goes to work.

Sophie begins to look around for tools or a way out, and finds her missing items, including her daughter's beloved toy and family photos with her face cut out of them. She realizes her suspicions of Mara were correct. She also finds a birth certificate and a letter from an adoption agency addressed to Mara, informing her that, despite her request, her biological mother did not wish to make contact with her. Because of the details in the documents, Sophie comes to believe that Mara was the baby she gave up.

While this is going on, Mara attempts to seduce Craig at his office, but they are interrupted by a phone call from his children's school. The school informs Craig that Sophie has not picked up the children. Craig needs to attend a meeting, so Mara offers to pick up the girls and take them to her house. When they arrive at Mara's house, Sophie, who is trying to escape via the air ducts, sees them through a floor vent in the kitchen. She tries to get her daughter's attention, but Mara discovers her instead.

Mara confronts Sophie in the basement and threatens her. Sophie tries to reason with Mara, who will have none of it. Sophie tells her she knows she is her mother, and she is sorry for giving her up. Mara strikes Sophie and smashes a bottle of wine on the floor. She drops a lit match on the wine, setting the basement on fire and hoping to kill Sophie. They struggle, and Mara's trouser legs catch fire, but Sophie saves her and helps Mara walk out to safety.

At the hospital, Craig is given the contents of his wife's pockets. Among them is the birth certificate and letter from the adoption agency. When Sophie wakes up, Craig tells her he knows about Mara, and they resolve to make their relationship work. Later, Sophie visits Mara in her hospital room, asking if she can include their story in her book. Sophie tells Mara she was brave to try to meet her, and she was a coward to refuse. Sophie asks for forgiveness, and they embrace as Mara weeps, apparently now forging a true mother-daughter bond. When the nurse tells Sophie she can't be there, she replies, "I'm her mother."

While Mara continues to recover at home, she pores over old news clippings and photos of her deceased childhood friend, Kate. There is a photo of Mara and Kate together as children in the orphanage, and we see that Kate looked just like Elly does now, and another photo of Mara and Kate together as adults in Kosovo. In that one, we see Kate grew up to be the spitting image of Sophie, revealing it was actually Kate who was Sophie's daughter. She then angrily cuts out Ruby's face from another of Sophie's family photos and replaces it with her own, so her face is next to Sophie's. The caption written in the scrapbook reads "Mother and Me".

Cast

 Susan Sarandon as Sophie Hartley
 Sam Neill as Craig Singleton
 Emily Blunt as Mara
 Charles 'Bud' Tingwell as Sam
 William McInnes as Jimmy 
 Georgie Parker as Jen 
 Terry Norris as Magistrate 
 Joanna Hunt-Prokhovnik as Elly 
 Lauren Mikkor as Ruby 
 Heather Mitchell as Rina 
 Jill Forster as Helen 
 Joelene Crnogorac as Anastasia 
 Geneviève Picot as Mara's Nurse 
 Carolyn Bock as Sophie's Nurse 
 Alethea McGrath as Maggie

References

External links
 
 
 

2006 films
2000s mystery drama films
2006 thriller drama films
Australian thriller drama films
Films shot in Melbourne
Films scored by David Hirschfelder
2006 drama films
2000s English-language films